Oscar Fitzallen Holcombe (December 31, 1888 – June 18, 1968) was an American businessman who served as the mayor of Houston, Texas, for 22 years, in 11 non-consecutive terms.

Biography
Holcombe was born in Mobile, Alabama, and raised in San Antonio, Texas. He moved to Houston when he was 18, and founded his own construction business, the O. F. Holcombe Company, at age 26. His business acumen and contacts eventually made Holcombe a millionaire.

Six years after founding his business, in 1921, Holcombe won his first term as mayor. He served as mayor from 1921 to 1929. Holcombe was defeated in the 1929 election by Walter Monteith, who supported a more fiscally conservative approach. Holcombe ran for mayor again in 1931, promising to do more for the unemployed, but Monteith was elected again.

Holcombe served subsequent mayoral terms from 1933 to 1937, 1939 to 1941, 1947 to 1953, and 1956 to 1958. His administrations were considered to be conservative and pro-business, though Holcombe was also aggressive about expanding the city's boundaries and improving public services (such as libraries, a municipal auditorium, and an improved sewage system).

Holcombe married Mary Grey Miller on May 3, 1912. They had one daughter, Elisabeth, who married Henry Markley Crosswell, Jr.

Honors
During the early 1960s, Houston renamed the stretch of Bellaire Boulevard east of Southside Place, which runs through the Texas Medical Center, as Holcombe Boulevard. In the late 1980s, the municipality of West University Place also renamed Bellaire Boulevard as Holcombe Boulevard within its jurisdiction.

References

External links

 Holcombe, Oscar. Oscar Holcombe Radio Addresses, Houston Oral History Project, October 28, 1940.

1888 births
1968 deaths
People from San Antonio
Mayors of Houston
20th-century American politicians